Talli is a village at a distance of 22 kilometers from Sibi city of Balochistan, Pakistan.

References

See also
 Sibi District
 Mehergarh
 Sevi
 Bibi Nani
 khajjak
 Marghazani
 Kurak

Populated places in Sibi District